Víctor Santos Montesinos (born 1977) is a cartoonist and screenwriter of Valencian comics. In 2002, he won the Prize Josep Toutain a l'Autor Revelació from the Barcelona International Comics Convention. Apart from publishing multiple comics in the Spanish market, he has worked for several American publishers like Image, DC Comics and IDW Publishing. He is one of the most fruitful Spanish authors of his generation and has been highlighted in the fantastic comic and the comic policíac. His largest and emblematic work is the comic series Los Reyes Elfos and is also known for the noir comic series Pulp Héroes. The author usually works as a solo author, but has also worked drawing scripts for other authors (especially for the American market) and as a screenwriter for other cartoonists.

Early life 
Santos studied Fine arts and was one of the founding members of the Valencian collective 7 Monos, which included Valencian students of Belles Arts i Arts i Oficis such as Manuel Bartual, Sergio Córdova and Jordi Bayarri.

Career

In the Spanish market

Beginning and Spanish publishers 
Santos published his first comics as part of the Los 7 Monos collective and immediately his series of fantasy comics Los Reyes Elfos was featured winning the Premi Josep Toutain a Millor Autor Revelació al Saló del Còmic de 2002 i 2003. His first professional publication was this title, first with Dude Comics then Dolmen Editorial, which published the majority of his works until the 2009. Other Spanish publishers that have published his works are Astiberri, Aleta Ediciones, Planet DeAgostini and Recerca Editorial.

Among his published works in the Spanish market, are: Pulp heroes, Protector, Aventuras en el Mundo Jung, Faeric gangs and Lone in heaven. Víctor Santos has screenwritten the three anthologies of Los Reyes Elfos and the albums of comics, LA sangre de las valkirias (drawing from Pere Pérez) and Silhouette (drawn by Jesus Alonso Iglsias).

Works in European and United States of America comics 
In 2006 he began to publish outside Spain: in France (Young Ronins, Ed. Soleil), Italy (Ricca da morire, Black Kaiser and Il sangue delle Valchirie) and in the United States (Image Comics), where he triumphed. To this last market, Víctor Santos published simultaneously three works in 2009, Filthy Rich (Vertigo), Mice Templar: Destiny (Image) and Demon Cleaner (Antarctic Press) and later he worked for the publisher IDW Publishing (Witch & Wizard and Godzila: Kingdom of Monsters)  and for Dark Horse Comics (Furious, Dark Horse Present and Polar, Wild Rover).

Works

Albums published in Spain

Albums published in other countries 
The albums of comics that Víctor Santos has published to other countries are:
 United States
 Black Market
 Polar Came from the cold
 Furious
 The Mice Templar. Destiny part 1
 The Mice Templar. Destiny part 2
 The Mice Templar. To Mid-Winter Night's Dream
 The Mice Templar. Legent Childbirth 1
 Filthy Rich
 Godzilla. Kingdom of Monsters Wants 2
 Godzilla. Kingdom of Monsters Wants 3
 Sleepy Hollow: Providence
 Witch & Wizard. Battle for Shadowland
 Witch & Wizard. Operation Zero
 Zombee
 Demon cleaner
 Until My Knuckles Bleed
 Digital publications USES
 Polar. Came from the Cold
 Furious
 The Mice Templar
 Witch & Wizard
 Godzila. Kingdom of the Monsters
 France
 Sale Fric. Filthy Rich
 Young Ronins. Rentrée des Classes
 Young Ronins. The offensive Osaki
 Italy
 Ricca da morire. Filthy Rich
 Black Kaiser
 Il sange delle Valchirie

Other works
 1998 - 1999 Gaijin, fascicle of comics of 7 Monos, number 1.
 1999 - Magia y acero, fascicle of comics of the publisher Anillo of Sirio/Ed. 7 Monos, numbers 1 and 10.
 1999 - Retales from the Cript, fascicle of comics of 7 Monos, number 1.
 2000 - 7 Novias para 7 Monos, fascicle of comics of 7 Monos, number 1.
 2000 - Alien College, fascicle of historietes of 7 Monos, numbers 1 and 2.
 2000 - Los Reyes Elfos, fascicle of comics of 7 Monos, numbers 1 and 2.
 2001 - Los Reyes Elfos. La doncella y los lobos, fascicle of historietes of 7 Monos, number 1.
 2002 - Dude Gold, album of comics of Dude Comics, number 9 (Los Reyes Elfos. The señor of Alfheim).
 2002 - Mono on the moon, fascicle of historietes, of 7 Monos, nº1.
 2002 - Extra Dude, fascicle of comics of Dude Comics, numbers 2, 3 and 4.
 2002 - Les hussards, fascicle of comics of 7 Monos nº2.
 2002 - Los Reyes Elfos. La emperadriz de hielo, fascicle of comics of Dude Comics, numbers 1, 2, 3 and 4.
 2003 - Faeric Gangs, album of comics of Astiberri Ediciones, nº1.
 2003 - Pulp Heroes, album of comics of Astiberri, nº1.
 2003 - Artículo 20, album of comics of Astiberri/Dolmen Editorial.
 2003 - Los Reyes Elfos. La espada de los inocentes, album of comics of Dude Comics.
 2004 - Iberia Book, album of comics of Dolmen Editorial, nº1 (Protective).
 2004 - Balas perdidas, album of comics of Aleta Ediciones, numbers 5 (Aventuras en el mundo Jung) and 10 (Lone in heaven).
 2004 - Boom!, fascicle of comics edited by the Asociación de Autores de Cómic de España, nº1.
 2004 - Fanhunter. The final conflict, album of comics edited by Planet DeAgostini, nº1.
 2004 - Marzo, en tinta propia, album of comics edited by Marzo, en tinta propia.
 2005 - Pulp héroes. Bushido, album of comics of Astiberri.
 2005 - Los Reyes Elfos. La doncella y los lobos, album of comics of Dolmen Editorial, nº1.
 2005 - Nobanda/Zone Joso, publication with comics edited by Santiago Navarro, numbers 2 (¡Hey Kids!) And 4 (Más que fantásticos).
 2006 - Los Reyes Elfos. Hasta los Dioses mueren, album of comics of Dolmen Editorial, nº1.
 2006 - El Mono Maltés, fascicle of comics, of 7 Monos, nº1.
 2006 - Los Reyes Elfos. Historia de Faerie, albums of comics of Dolmen Editorial, numbers 1, 2 and 3.
 2006 - Bull Damn City, album of comics of Dolmen Editorial, nº1.
 2006 - Bull Damn city. El día de la Zarigüeya, album of comics of Dolmen Editorial, nº1.
 2006 - Agenda FNAC 2007, publication with comics nº1.
 2007 - GEI (Vol 2), fascicle of historietes of Recerca Editorial, nº1.
 2007 - Al mejor postor, album of comics of Dolmen Editorial.
 2007 - Dos veces breve, magazine of comics of Ariadna Editorial, numbers 12 and 18.
 2007 - Works, publication with comics of Dolmen Editorial, nº2 (Works, el Arte of Víctor Santos).
 2008 - Los Reyes Elfos. La emperadriz de hielo, album of comics of Dolmen Editorial nº1.
 2008 - Bull Damn City. Zombies, album of comics of Dolmen Editorial, nº1.
 2008 - el Manglar, magazine of comics of Dibbuks, numbers 8 and 10.
 2008 - El Balanzin, fascicle of comics of APIE-EIEP, nº4.
 2008 - Demon Claner, album of comics of Dolmen Editorial, nº1.
 2009 - Black Kaiser, album of comics of Planet DeAgostini, nº1.
 2009 - La sangre de las Valkirias, album of comics of Planet DeAgostini.
 2009 - Bull DAmn War, album of comics of Dolmen Editorial.
 2009 - Los Reyes Elfos. Glirenn. La reina de los Elfos Negros, album of comics of Dolmen, nº1.
 2010 - Zombee, album of comics of Dolmen.
 2010 - Silhouette, album of comics of Dolmen.
 2010 - Asquerosamente rich, album of comics of Panini.
 2011 - Al mejor postor, digital publication of Dolmen/Esdecómic.
 2011 - TBO4Japan, publication with comics of Dibbuks.
 2012 - Día del cómic gratis español, fascicle of comics of Zone Comic.
 2013 - Morirse in Bilbao, fascicle of historietes, nº2.
 Without date - Compa(ñ)ero Leonardo, publication with historietes edited by Semana Black/Pepsi.

Prizes and success 
Víctor Santos has won six prizes from Barcelona International Comics Convention, two from Ficomic at Madrid and a prize from Dolmen Editorial's critics as the best cartoonist. As The New York Times states, his works Filthy Rich and Witch & Wizard are bestsellers.

References

Sources 
 PONS, Álvaro, PORCEL, Pedro y SORNÍ, Vicente. Viñetas a la Luna de Valencia.  Castalla: Edicions de Ponent, Collection Grey Papers, 2007. Depósito Legal: A-295-2007. .

External links 
 Víctor Santos' blog
 Víctor Santos' Online comic-books
 Víctor Santos by José A. Serrano in "Guía of the Cómic". There are many links and a lot of information on his works.
 Víctor Santos in comicvine
 Video from youtube of Víctor Santos drawing

People from Valencia
Spanish cartoonists
1977 births
Living people
Date of birth missing (living people)